Mars-la-Tour is a commune in the Meurthe-et-Moselle department in northeastern France.

History
The Battle of Mars-la-Tour was fought on 16 August 1870 during the Franco-Prussian War near the town of Mars-la-Tour.

The railway line between Longuyon and Pogny reached Mars-la-Tour in 1876, at which time a small train station was built. On August 30, 1919, the station witnessed a small accident when a freight train collided with a train full of coal, killing one train's conductor. The station no longer exists, however.

See also
Communes of the Meurthe-et-Moselle department
Parc naturel régional de Lorraine

References

Marslatour
Three Bishoprics